Offensee is a lake located at the western end of the Totes Gebirge mountain range in Upper Austria's part of the Salzkammergut.

Lakes of Upper Austria